Saibh Anna Young (born 5 September 1967) is an Irish former cricketer who played as a right-arm medium bowler. She appeared in one Test match and 36 One Day Internationals for Ireland between 1990 and 2001. She took a hat-trick in an ODI against England in 2001.

References

External links
 
 

1967 births
Living people
Cricketers from County Dublin
Ireland women One Day International cricketers
Ireland women Test cricketers
Irish women cricketers
Women's One Day International cricket hat-trick takers